Acacia cassicula is a shrub of the genus Acacia and the subgenus Plurinerves that is endemic to an area of south western Australia.

Description
It can have glabrous or sparsely finely haired branchlets. Like most species of Acacia it has phyllodes rather than true leaves. It blooms from August to September and produces yellow flowers. It produces simple inflorescences that occur singly in the axils and have spherical flower-heads with a diameter of  containing 22 to 30 flowers. Following flowering it produces glabrous and papery seed pods that have a linera shape and are strongly curved to coiled once or twice.

Distribution
It is native to an area in the Wheatbelt and Great Southern regions of Western Australia where it is commonly situated on undulating plains growing in sandy loam soils. It has a disjunct scattered distribution from around Wagin in the north west to around Jerramungup in the south east growing in granitic based soils as a part of Eucalyptus occidentalis woodland communities.

See also
 List of Acacia species

References

cassicula
Acacias of Western Australia
Taxa named by Bruce Maslin
Plants described in 1990
Taxa named by Richard Sumner Cowan